Probištip is a town in North Macedonia, and seat of Probištip Municipality. The town has a population of 10,826.

Features

Probištip is located in the southwest corner of the Osogovo Mountains, in northeastern North Macedonia. The region has been well-known since Roman times for its mineral wealth and mining industry, which flourished during Yugoslav times. It has a long tradition of hearty country eating, and is close to both the monastery of Gabriel Lesnovski (dedicated to St.Archangel Michael and St.Gavril Lesnovski) and the stone formations of Kuklica. The mines of Zletovo provide most of the natural materials that are processed in Probištip.

History
The history of Probištip and its vicinity comprises the building and the existence of the Lesnovo monastery, which is today one of the most important and most valuable monuments of culture in North Macedonia.

Sports
Local football club FK Rudar plays in the Macedonian Third League.

Twin cities
  Komádi – Hungary
  Mioveni – Romania

References

External links
Official page of the local government
Google satellite map

Cities in North Macedonia
Probištip Municipality